Atienza is a surname. Notable people with the surname include:
Danilo Atienza, Filipino pilot in the Philippine Air Force
David Atienza, Swiss engineer
Edward Atienza, British stage and film actor
Juan Beigbeder Atienza, Spanish Minister of Foreign Affairs during World War II
Juan de Atienza, Spanish missionary in South America
Kim Atienza, Filipino actor and former politician
Kyle Atienza, Filipino volleyball athlete
Lito Atienza, Filipino politician and former mayor of the city of Manila
Pichu Atienza, Spanish footballer